Rádio Gaúcha is a Brazilian radio station in Porto Alegre, capital of the state of Rio Grande do Sul. It is owned and operated by Grupo RBS, the major media company in Rio Grande do Sul and one of the most important media conglomerates in Brazil. The station broadcasts a news/talk and sports programming, as well as live sports coverage. Its broadcast in FM 93.7 MHz, with owned and operated stations in Santa Maria (FM 105.7 MHz), Caxias do Sul (FM 102.7 MHz) and Rio Grande (FM 102.1 MHz). Until 2021, Rádio Gaúcha was also broadcast in AM 600 kHz. The station's AM night signal, through propagating sky waves from the ionosphere, reached parts of Santa Catarina, Paraná, São Paulo and parts of Uruguay and Argentina. On July 21, 2021, the AM signal has been switch-off. With the change, the radio station starts to focus on the FM dial, on its O&Os and affiliated stations and on digital platforms, following the trend of discontinuation of AM radio in the Brazilian radio market.

Founded in February 1927, Rádio Gaúcha is the oldest broadcaster in Rio Grande do Sul still in operation and is considered to be the largest radio network in Brazil, with four owned and operated stations in Rio Grande do Sul and more than 140 affiliates.

Anchors
 Antônio Carlos Macedo
 Daniel Scola
 Jocimar Farina
 Kelly Matos
 David Coimbra
 Filipe Gamba
 Pedro Ernesto Denardin
 Marcelo Drago
 Andressa Xavier
 Leandro Staudt
 Eduardo Gabardo
 Giane Guerra
 Luciano Potter
 Rosane de Oliveira
 Sara Bodowsky

Sports narrators
 Pedro Ernesto Denardin
 Gustavo Manhago
 Marcelo de Bona

Correspondents
 Débora Cademartori (Brasília)

References

External links 
 Official page (in Portuguese)

Brazilian radio networks
Grupo RBS
1927 establishments in Brazil
Mass media in Porto Alegre
Radio stations established in 1927